Seydgah may refer to:
 Seydgah-e Haviq
 Seydgah-e Khotbeh Sara